Heliades huachucalis is a species of moth of the family Pyralidae. It is found in Arizona (the Huachuca Mountains).

References

Moths described in 1915
Chrysauginae